The Disputes Tribunal is a small claims court in New Zealand. It can hear certain civil claims up to a disputed sum of $30,000. Many claims are for relatively small amounts. The Tribunal has offices and holds hearings at locations in major towns and cities throughout the country.

The Tribunal is administered under the Disputes Tribunal Act 1988.

References

External links 
 Official Website
 Disputes Tribunals Act 1988

New Zealand court system
1988 establishments in New Zealand
Courts and tribunals established in 1988